Mhlongo is a surname. It may refer to:

Benson Mhlongo (born 1980), South African football (soccer) player
Brighton Mhlongo (born 1991), South African football (soccer) player
Busi Mhlongo (1947–2010), South African virtuoso singer, dancer and composer 
Niq Mhlongo (born 1973), South African journalist and novelist
Stairs Mhlongo (born 1987), South African rugby union player